Harris Georgiades (born 9 April 1972) is a Greek Cypriot economist and politician. He was pivotal in the successful implementation of the economic reform plan for Cyprus and its successful conclusion in 2016.

Harris Georgiades is chairman of the Foreign and European Affairs Committee of the Cyprus Parliament and Deputy Leader of the Democratic Rally Party. He served as Minister of Finance of the Republic of Cyprus between April 2013 – December 2019.

Born in 1972 in Nicosia, he holds a BA and an MA in international relations and economics from the University of Reading, UK. Between 1999 and 2011 he was managing director of a family-owned hotel business.

In 2011 he was elected to the Cyprus House of Representatives with the Democratic Rally, a member of the centre-right European Peoples Party. 
Was appointed as Minister of Finance in 2013, at the height of a severe financial crisis. He was successful in restoring the soundness of the Cyprus economy, placing it in a path of solid economic growth, surplus budgets, rating upgrades and banking sector restructuring.

He was a long-serving member of the Eurogroup and the ECOFIN and was elected chairman of the Board of Governors the European Bank for Reconstruction and Development for the period 2014–2015. In 2016 he was selected by POLITICO as one of 28 influential Europeans and in 2019 was Chair of the Commonwealth Finance Ministers Summit.

He was elected as Deputy Leader of the governing Democratic Rally Party in January 2020 and was re-elected to the House of Representatives in May 2021.

Other activities

European Union organizations 
 European Investment Bank (EIB), Ex-Officio Member of the Board of Governors (2013–2019) 
 European Stability Mechanism (ESM), Ex-Officio Member of the Board of Governors (2013–2019)

International organizations 
 European Bank for Reconstruction and Development (EBRD), chairman of the Board of Governors (2014–2015)
 International Monetary Fund (IMF), Ex-Officio Member of the Board of Governors (2013–2019)
 Multilateral Investment Guarantee Agency (MIGA), World Bank Group, Ex-Officio Member of the Board of Governors (2013–2019)
 World Bank, Ex-Officio Member of the Board of Governors (2013–2019)

Non-profit organizations 
 World Economic Forum (WEF), Member of the Europe Policy Group (since 2017)

Recognition 
In 2016, Georgiades was featured in POLITICO magazine as one of the 28 most influential Europeans

References

1972 births
Cyprus Ministers of Finance
Greek Cypriot people
Living people